Daisy Fancourt (born June 1990) is a British researcher who is an Associate Professor of Psychobiology and Epidemiology at University College London. Her research focuses on the effects of social factors on health, including loneliness, social isolation, community assets, arts and cultural engagement, and social prescribing. During the COVID-19 pandemic Fancourt led a team running the UK's largest study into the psychological and social impact of COVID-19 and established the international network COVID Minds, aiming to better understand the impact of coronavirus disease on mental health and well-being.

Early life and education 
Fancourt earned her bachelor's degree at the University of Oxford and her master's at King's College London in 2012. Fancourt joined the National Health Service, where she worked at the Chelsea and Westminster Hospital on arts and clinical innovations. She eventually returned to academia, and earned her doctoral degree in 2016 at University College London (UCL) where she worked in psychoneuroimmunology.

Research and career 
After her PhD, Fancourt moved to Imperial College London as a postdoctoral researcher, where she was based in the Centre for Performance Science from 2013-2017. The Centre for Performance Science is a partnership between Imperial College School of Medicine and the Royal College of Music. Fancourt studied the biological impact of the arts, with a particular focus on the use of music in clinical settings. Her work led to the publication of a new theoretical model for how music affects immune response. She also developed and researched a number of new arts programmes to support clinical outcomes, including a community drumming intervention for people with mental illness, a singing programme for mothers with postnatal depression, and a choir programme for people affected by cancer. Some of these programmes have since received clinical commissioning within the National Health Service. At the annual Imperial College London festival, Fancourt analysed the capacity of men and women to play board games whilst listening to music, and showed that men perform worse when there is rock music in the background. The study was awarded a prize by the Medical Journal of Australia. During her time at Imperial, Fancourt also acted as Director of Research for Breathe Health Research, an organisation that looked to support children with hemiplegia through magic training. 
For her contributions to science and the arts, Fancourt was made the British Science Association Jacob Bronowski Award Lecturer in 2016.

In 2017 joined University College London as a Wellcome Trust research fellow in epidemiology. During her Fellowship, Fancourt carried out the first epidemiological analyses of arts engagement and health, showing longitudinal associations with incidence and management of a range of mental health conditions and aspects of age-related decline. She also published studies showing how loneliness and social isolation affect neuro-immune markers, cardiovascular events, and hospital admissions for respiratory disease. The same year, Fancourt was selected as one of the BBC Radio 3 Next Generation Thinkers. As part of the award, Fancourt had the opportunity to create content for BBC Radio 3 and BBC Radio 4. In 2018, Fancourt began working with the World Health Organization to develop an agenda that connected the arts, health and well-being.  In a landmark report with WHO, Fancourt concluded that arts interventions, including singing in a choir to improve the outcomes of chronic obstructive pulmonary disease, present low-cost treatment options for healthcare workers. The report was named the Global Aesthetic Achievement of 2019. To further global research and policy work on arts and health, in 2021, Fancourt was appointed Director of the WHO Collaborating Centre for Arts & Health.

During the COVID-19 pandemic, Fancourt established the network COVID Minds that looked to better understand the impact of coronavirus disease on mental health. The network collates longitudinal international mental health studies during the pandemic, offering opportunities for researchers to join projects and sharing regular updates with members of the public. Fancourt is leading the COVID–19 Social Study, an investigation looking at the social experiences of adults in the United Kingdom during the outbreak. The study collects information on the psychological and social challenges that people in the UK faced during the pandemic. In particular, the COVID-19 Social Study looked to better understand how the virus and enforced social isolation impacted mental health and loneliness. The outcomes of the survey are regularly reported, allowing policymakers and the media to better understand and report on the impact of lockdown. At the end of April 2020 the social study had over 75,000 participants and by April 2021 had collected over 1 million responses.  As part of the social study Fancourt also conducted in-depth surveys of over 350 adults, exploring the impact of social isolation. Her results showed that prior to the lockdown officially beginning there was a decline in happiness. However, over the course of April Fancourt showed that levels of well-being had increased and levels of anxiety had decreased. Fancourt was appointed to the Lancet Covid-19 Commission and the WHO Technical Advisory Group on Mental Health in COVID.

Awards and honours 
 2016 British Science Association Jacob Bronowski Award Lecture for Science and the Arts
 2017 British Academy Rising Star Engagement Award
 2017 World Economic Forum Global Shaper
 2017 BBC New Generation Thinker
2018 Philip Leverhulme Prize

Selected publications

Journal articles

Books

References 

Living people
British psychologists
British women academics
British women psychologists
Alumni of Christ Church, Oxford
Alumni of University College London
Alumni of King's College London
Academics of University College London
1990 births